The Sepidiini is a tribe of ground-dwelling darkling beetles (Tenebrionidae), that occurs across Africa, the Mediterranean Basin, the Arabian Peninsula and Mesopotamia. It is composed of many hundreds of species. The larvae of some species are known to damage crops.

Morphology
Their morphology is complex due to their richly divergent forms. They are distinguished from the diurnal taxa, by their well-developed and true hypomera of the elytra, the free mobility of the thorax and hind body, and the free and non-fused pleurital and pleural margins of the sterna and elytra respectively.

Biology
Their morphology is believed to facilitate moisture absorption and accumulation, via the open body sutures and the loosely joined body parts. Subtribe Trachynotina excepting, they show an almost uniform tendency to be nocturnal, crepuscular or shade-loving. Like the tribe Tentyriini, their daily rhythm is based on a strictly nocturnal ancestral disposition. Their open and non-connate body sutures suggest the enjoyment of nocturnal conditions and night moisture.

At night, a surface secretion of a sometimes pruinescent or waxy substance has been noted on the bodies of genera Brinckia, Namibomodes,  Synhimba and Ocnodes (or Phanerotomea). This is assumed to prevent evaporation.

Taxonomy
The tribe Sepidiini is made up of 6 subtribes, 70 genera, and more than 1000 species. These genera belong to the tribe Sepidiini:

 Hypomelina
 Argenticrinis Louw, 1979
 Bombocnodulus Koch, 1955
 Brinckia Koch, 1962
 Hypomelus Solier, 1843
 Iugidorsum Louw, 1979
 Sulcipectus Louw, 1979
 Trachynotidus Péringuey, 1899
 Triangulipenna Louw, 1979
 Uniungulum Koch, 1962

 Molurina
 Amiantus 
 Argenticrinis 
 Arturium 
 Bombocnodulus 
 Brachyphrynus 
 Chiliarchum 
 Dichtha 
 Distretus 
 Euphrynus 
 Glyptophrynus 
 Huilamus 
 Mariazofia 
 Melanolophus 
 Moluris 
 Ocnodes 
 Piesomera 
 Phrynocolus 
 Phrynophanes 
 Physophrynus 
 Psammodes 
 Psammophanes 
 Psammorhyssus 
 Psammotyria 
 Stridulomus 
 Tarsocnodes 
 Toktokkus 
 Tibiocnodes 
 Tuberocnodes 

 Oxurina
 Decoriplus Louw, 1979
 Miripronotum Louw, 1979
 Namibomodes Koch, 1952
 Oxura Kirby, 1819
 Palpomodes Koch, 1952
 Pterostichula Koch, 1952
 Stenethmus Gebien, 1937
 Synhimba Koch, 1952

 Phanerotomeina
 Huilamus Koch, 1953
 Ocnodes Fåhraeus, 1870
 Psammoryssus Kolbe, 1886
 Stridulomus Koch, 1955
 Tarsocnodes Gebien, 1920

 Sepidiina
 Dimoniacis Koch, 1958
 Echinotus Solier, 1843
 Peringueyia Koch, 1958
 Sepidiopsis Gestro, 1892
 Sepidiostenus Fairmaire, 1884
 Sepidium Fabricius, 1775
 Vieta Laporte, 1840
 Vietomorpha Fairmaire, 1887

 Trachynotina
 Cyrtoderes Dejean, 1834
 Epairopsis Koch, 1955
 Ethmus Haag-Rutenberg-Rutenberg, 1873
 Histrionotus Koch, 1955
 Microphligra Koch, 1955
 Ossiporis Pascoe, 1866
 Oxycerus Koch, 1955
 Somaticus Hope, 1840
 Trachynotus Latreille, 1828
 Trichethmus Gebien, 1937

Gallery

References

External links
 Molurini , micro*scope
 
 

Pimeliinae
Polyphaga tribes